Rough Night (released in some countries as Girls' Night Out) is a 2017 American black comedy film directed by Lucia Aniello (in her feature debut) and written by Aniello and Paul W. Downs. It stars Scarlett Johansson, Kate McKinnon, Jillian Bell, Ilana Glazer and Zoë Kravitz in lead roles, as well as Paul Downs, Ty Burrell and Demi Moore in supporting roles. The story follows a bachelorette party that goes wrong after a male stripper dies.

The film was released in the United States on June 16, 2017, by Sony Pictures Releasing through Columbia Pictures, received mixed reviews and grossed $47 million worldwide against a production budget of about $26 million hence becoming a box office bomb.

Plot
In 2006, four friends, Jess, Alice, Frankie and Blair, bond during their first year of college. A decade later they reunite as Jess is about to marry Peter. Alice decides that the four should spend the weekend in Miami partying. They are also joined by Pippa, Jess's friend from her semester in Australia. Alice, who considers herself to be Jess's best friend, is immediately jealous of Pippa.

The friends get high on cocaine and party at a club and then decide to hire a male stripper. At the vacation house, he makes Jess uncomfortable with his rough talk. Alice decides to take a turn and jumps  on him, causing them to both fall and the stripper to die after hitting his head on the fireplace. Before they decide what to do, Jess takes a call from Peter and mentions that her friends hired a stripper and she is confused. Peter thinks that she is leaving him and becomes distraught. His friends tell him that he should drive down to Miami to win her back.

The friends purchase a burner phone to call Blair's lawyer uncle. After telling them they moved the body, he tells them they could face up to fifteen years in prison unless no body is found. They decide to dispose of the body, throwing it into the ocean.

After doing so, they think the neighbors' security camera caught them on tape, and send Blair to seduce them for the footage, only to discover the cameras don't work after she has slept with them. By this point, the body has washed up back on the shore and they must come up with a new plan to dispose of it.

A police officer knocks on their door and Frankie knocks him out after he gropes her, only for them to realize he was the stripper they had hired, leaving them to wonder who was killed. They try to dispose of the body again, with the stripper's car, only to return defeated after a car accident. Then when Alice finds out Jess invited Frankie and Blair to a bridal shower over her, Jess berates her for her obsessive clinginess and storms off to prepare for the consequences.

At this point, two police officers arrive and tell the women they are not in trouble as the man they killed was a violent criminal who had been on the run from the police. As they interrogate the women Pippa realizes that the "police" are actually accomplices of the man killed. Realizing they are caught, the men tie up the women and the now-awakened stripper and threaten to shoot them.

Jess meanwhile has missed most of the drama due to being upstairs taking a shower in preparation for her mugshot. Realizing what has happened, she subdues one of the captors using hairspray and handcuffs and fights off the other one as he prepares to kill Blair. After Alice shoots the second captor, the first reappears, having removed the toy handcuffs, only to be run over by Peter, high on the drugs he took to keep him awake on his roadtrip to Miami.

Jess reaffirms that she wants to marry Peter and they do it that weekend at a foam party with their friends. Frankie and Blair reunite as a couple and Alice hooks up with Scotty, the police officer stripper from the bachelorette party.

In a mid-credits scene, Pippa sings lyrics that allude to the evening, and after the credits Alice finds the thief's stolen diamonds that had been stashed in a box of naughty pasta from the bachelorette party.

Cast
 Scarlett Johansson as Jessica "Jess" Thayer
 Jillian Bell as Alice
 Kate McKinnon as Pippa/Kiwi
 Ilana Glazer as Frankie
 Zoë Kravitz as Blair
 Paul W. Downs as Peter
 Demi Moore as Lea
 Ty Burrell as Pietro
 Ryan Cooper as Jay ("Scotty"), the fake stripper
 Colton Haynes as Scotty McBody, the real stripper
 Dean Winters as Detective Frazier
 Enrique Murciano as Detective Ruiz
 Bo Burnham as Tobey
 Eric André as Jake
 Hasan Minhaj as Joe
 Patrick Carlyle as Patrick
 Karan Soni as Raviv
 Peter Francis James as Uncle Jack
 Caldwell Tidicue as DJ (Club Liv)
 Stephan Amenta as Guy at Party

Production
On the strength of Aniello's success with Broad City, the film was the subject of an intense bidding war, of which Sony Pictures Entertainment was announced as the winner in June 2015. The script was among the 2015 Black List of unproduced scripts. Aniello has referred to the movie as "a comedic version of The Big Chill".

In December 2015, Scarlett Johansson joined the film to play the lead role. In April 2016, Zoë Kravitz joined the film, with the rest of the main cast announced the next month. Principal photography began in August 2016 in Saddle Rock, New York. In late September 2016, filming was taking place in Mount Vernon, New York. The film spent $26 million in New York State and received $6 million in tax rebates.

The film was originally titled Rock That Body but was renamed to Rough Night, possibly due to copyright issues as "Rock Your Body" had already been used as a song title by Justin Timberlake.

Music
Dominic Lewis composed the film's musical score.

Release

Theatrical
Rough Night was scheduled to be released on June 23, 2017. It was then moved up a week to June 16.

Marketing
The studio spent about $35 million on promotion and advertisements.

Reception

Box office
Rough Night grossed $22.1 million in the United States and Canada and $25.2 million in other territories for a worldwide total of $47.3 million, against a production budget of $20 million.

In North America, the film was released alongside All Eyez on Me, 47 Meters Down and Cars 3, and was initially projected to gross $10–14 million from 3,162 theaters in its opening weekend. After making just $3.4 million on its first day (including $700,000 from Thursday night previews ), weekend projections were revised to $9 million. It ended up debuting to $8 million, finishing 7th at the box office.<ref name="opening">{{cite web |date= June 18, 2017 |author= Anthony D'Alessandro |url=https://deadline.com/2017/06/cars-3-all-eyez-on-me-tupac-shakur-rough-night-scarlett-johansson-mandy-moore-47-meters-below-1202114764/ |title=Cars 3' $53M+ Is Third Best Debut For Pixar Series; 'Wonder Woman' Still Wows With $40M+; 'All Eyez On Me' Solid |work=Deadline Hollywood |access-date=January 18, 2021 }}</ref> In its second weekend the film grossed $4.7 million (a drop of just over 41%), finishing 8th at the box office.

Critical response
On Rotten Tomatoes, the film has an approval rating of 45% based on 173 reviews, with an average rating of 5.20/10. The website's critical consensus reads, "Rough Nights gifted stars are certainly good for some laughs, but their talents aren't properly utilized in a scattered comedy that suffers from too many missed opportunities." On Metacritic, the film has a weighted average score of 51 out of 100, based on reviews from 40 critics, indicating "mixed or average reviews". Audiences polled by CinemaScore gave the film an average grade of "C+" on an A+ to F scale, while PostTrak reported filmgoers gave it a 66% overall positive score.

Owen Gleiberman of Variety wrote: "Rough Night, a bachelorette-party-from-hell thriller comedy that's got some push and some laughs, despite its essentially formulaic nature, is a perfect example of why Hollywood needs (many) more women filmmakers."

The cast received positive notices, even though the film as a whole did not. Peter Travers of Rolling Stone wrote "The women in Rough Night are terrific company. They never wear out their welcome. You can't say the same for the movie." Manohla Dargis of The New York Times said "It's all blithely formulaic and would be more irritating if the performers — who include Zoë Kravitz and Illana Glazer — weren't generally so appealing."
David Rooney  of The Hollywood Reporter wrote: "All the talented women here are stuck playing types rather than characters, in a strained frolic in which both the verbal humor and the physical gags too often fall flat."

Critics have pointed out strong similarities between Rough Night and the 1998 Peter Berg black comedy Very Bad Things.

Adaptation
The film was later adapted in India in Telugu language as Anukunnadi Okkati Ayyandhi Okati'' which released on 6 March 2020 through Amazon Prime Video.

References

Further reading

External links
 
 

2017 films
2017 black comedy films
2017 directorial debut films
2017 LGBT-related films
2010s buddy comedy films
2010s English-language films
2010s female buddy films
American black comedy films
American buddy comedy films
American female buddy films
American LGBT-related films
Bisexuality-related films
Female bisexuality in film
Lesbian-related films
LGBT-related buddy comedy films
LGBT-related black comedy films
Films about parties
Films about death
Films about striptease
Films about vacationing
Films set in 2006
Films set in 2016
Films set in Miami
Films shot in New York (state)
Films produced by Matt Tolmach
Films scored by Dominic Lewis
Columbia Pictures films
2010s American films